Coffee service refers to the many and various styles in which coffee is made available to people, such as in restaurants and hotels. In particular, it sometimes refers to the set of dishes and vessels utilized to serve and consume coffee, akin to the notion of a tea service. 

Coffee service is also a catch-all term for services related to the delivery of coffee to employees of a business at low or no cost to them. Providing  coffee to employees is popular among employers since employees will likely not leave the workplace to purchase coffee, subsequently reducing lost work time. Employers also see coffee service as a perk with a low cost.

Coffee services

Vending

Some companies, with high traffic of visitors and employees, opt to install a coffee dispenser (vending machine) as their coffee service. Typically these machines give the user the choice of various types of coffee, tea and hot chocolate. Money collected is usually kept by the employer to offset the cost of the maintenance contract and for the purchase of the instant coffee used by the machine. However, sometimes companies make the coffee from such machines free. Unfortunately, the coffee dispensed by these machines is usually of low quality.

Electric coffee maker
Another option is to use an automatic espresso or drip coffee maker which grinds the coffee beans and dispenses the coffee into a cup. These machines do not charge per cup, but often provide a bypass slot where the employee can add their own coffee beans. By providing low quality beans, employees can be encouraged to provide their own beans. The cost of the maintenance contract still falls on the employer, however it is about the same as the cost of the machine per year.

"Frac pacs"
An increasingly popular preparation offered by coffee service providers is known as a frac pac. This is ground coffee in a self-contained packet, enveloped by a filter. This allows a conventional drip coffee maker to be used, but without the mess of cleaning out the old grounds and without the requirement to measure out the right amount of coffee. The user only needs remove the old pack and to place the new pack into their coffee machine. 

The downside of such a service is quality of the coffee. Unless canned, coffee needs to be brewed within the first week of roasting and within four hours of grinding for the best quality. Since local roasters will generally not have a filter enveloping machine, these packs are shipped great distances and may be weeks old before they even arrive at the office.

Onsite espresso bars
Some companies now provide on their premises full espresso bars where employees or contractors provide a full range of espresso drinks, free of charge or at company-subsidized prices.

See also

 Cafeteria
 Caffitaly
 Coffee pod
 Easy Serving Espresso Pod
 Flavia Beverage Systems
 K-Cup
 New England Coffee
 T-Discs
 Tea service
 Third wave of coffee

Coffee-service men and women
 Barista
 Bikini barista

References

Coffeeware